The long march through the institutions is a slogan coined by socialist student activist Rudi Dutschke around 1967 to describe his strategy for establishing the conditions for revolution: subverting capitalist domination of society by entering institutions such as the professions. The phrase "long march" is a reference to the prolonged struggle of the Chinese communists, which included a physical Long March of their army across China.

Influences
Similarities have been noted between the long march and Antonio Gramsci's idea of "war of position". Evidence is lacking, however, that Dutschke was aware of Gramsci's work at the time. There is no mention of Gramsci in Dutschke's diaries or biography, contrasting with many mentions of György Lukács, Che Guevara, and Mao Zedong.

Marxist philosopher Ernst Bloch has been identified as an influence on Dutschke's thinking. Bloch met Dutschke at Bad Boll in 1968, and admired his integrity and determination, qualities that he had written about in The Principle of Hope (Das Prinzip Hoffnung) as being essential for the achievement of utopia.
 
Dutschke collaborated with Herbert Marcuse at least as early as 1966, when they organized an anti-war conference at the Institute for Social Research. Marcuse corresponded with Dutschke in 1971 to agree with this strategy: "Let me tell you this: that I regard your notion of the 'long march through the institutions' as the only effective way..." In his 1972 book, Counterrevolution and Revolt, Marcuse wrote:

See also
 Entryism
 Fifth column
 Long game
 Paradigm shift
 Vanguardism

References

Works cited

Further reading

Revolution terminology
Communist terminology